Digne-les-Bains is a commune in the departement of Alpes-de-Haute-Provence in France.

Digne-les-Bains may also refer to:
 Arrondissement of Digne-les-Bains, an arrondissement in the departement of Alpes-de-Haute-Provence, France
 Canton of Digne-les-Bains-1, a canton in the departement of Alpes-de-Haute-Provence, France
 Canton of Digne-les-Bains-2, a canton in the departement of Alpes-de-Haute-Provence, France

See also 
 Digne (disambiguation)